Thomas Petrie (31 January 1831 – 26 August 1910) was an Australian explorer, gold prospector, logger, and grazier. He was a Queensland pioneer.

Early life 
Petrie was born at Edinburgh, fourth son of Andrew Petrie and brother of John. His family travelled to Sydney, arriving in October 1831 and his father entered the government service as a supervisor of building. They moved to the Moreton Bay penal colony (subsequently Brisbane) in 1837, where Thomas was educated by a convict clerk and allowed to mix freely with Aboriginal children. He learnt to speak the local language, Turrbal and was encouraged to share in all Aboriginal activities. He was witness to convicts labouring in chains on the government farms along the river and saw numerous floggings of convicts on Queen Street. Petrie was also in the crowd that watched the first hangings at the settlement in 1841, that of the Aboriginal men Nungavil and Mullan at The Old Windmill. At 14 he participated in a walkabout to a feast in the Bunya Mountains. He was accepted by the Aboriginal people and was often used as a messenger and invited on exploration expeditions. He also learned about surveying, bushcraft and the local geography while travelling with his father.

Career 
In 1851 Petrie prospected for gold in the Turon region of New South Wales and spent the next five years on Victorian goldfields also known as 'finding only enough gold to make a ring!' since it was their motto. He returned to Brisbane a number of times and saw the botched public hanging of Dalla man Dundalli in 1855 at Wickham Park. Petrie married Elizabeth Campbell in 1859 and shortly after the marriage, Petrie sought the advice of a local Aboriginal elder named Dalaipi for a good place to start a cattle station. Dalaipi's son, Dal-ngang showed him their ancestral land at Mandin (North Pine River) and offered it to Petrie. Dal-ngang expressed indignation when told this land had already been acquired by the Griffens as part of the Whiteside station. Petrie, after consulting with Mrs Griffen bought a ten square mile (26 km2) section of the property in the Pine Creek district and named it Murrumba, an Aboriginal word meaning "good place" (possibly Turrbal or Yugarabul based on location). Aboriginal people helped him to clear his land and build his farm buildings.

On 26 June 1861, Thomas Petrie appeared at the proceedings of the Select Committee on the Native Police Force to give evidence. Petrie's views on Aboriginal people had hardened by this stage as he was supportive of both the composition and continuation of the force, even though he admitted that many Aboriginal people around his residence had been shot by the detachment under Frederick Wheeler based at Sandgate. He also said that Aboriginal people were definitely cannibals and that they should be forbidden to go into Brisbane unless they had "a pass or accompanied by their masters". He claimed that he paid Aboriginal people that worked for him in clothing only, as they would otherwise spend money on alcohol and that it was commonplace for Aboriginal people to be paid for their labour with rum.

Petrie continued to look for new timber and places suitable for European settlement. In 1862, he headed to the Maroochy River area with a group of 25 Aboriginal people that included Ker-Walli, Wanangga and Billy Dingy. On this journey, he became the first white man to climb Buderim Mountain and also ventured up the tributaries of the Maroochy River looking to exploit the large cedar growing there. At Petrie's Creek, he established a logging camp which was run by Aboriginal labour. At this camp, the Aboriginal workers requested that Petrie brand them with his logging symbol. This was done by using a piece of glass and then rubbing charcoal into the wound. He later surveyed a route from Cleveland to Eight Mile Plains. He also arranged for some Aboriginal people to welcome the Duke of Edinburgh in 1868. In 1877 the Douglas ministry established Queensland's first Aboriginal reserve on Bribie Island with Petrie as its chief adviser and overseer, but the reserve was closed in 1878 by colonial secretary Palmer.

Later life 

Petrie died at Murrumba on 26 August 1910. He was buried in Lawnton Cemetery. He was survived by his wife (who died aged 90 on 30 September 1926) and by two sons and five daughters of their nine children. Though Murrumba had been reduced to 3000 acres (12 km2) the family kept the property until 1952. In 1910 the name of the North Pine district was changed to Petrie in his honour.

Legacy 
In 1904 Tom Petrie's Reminiscences of Early Queensland was published, written by his daughter, Constance Campbell Petrie. The book is regarded as one of the best authorities on Brisbane's early days.

In 1910 the name of the North Pine district was changed to Petrie in his honour.

On Saturday 15 July 1911, a freestone monument to Thomas Petrie was unveiled by Sir William MacGregor, the Queensland Governor. It is outside the North Pine School of Arts in Petrie Place Park, 1014-1030 Anzac Avenue, Petrie.

On 19 June 2009, a new suburb in the area was named Murrumba Downs after Tom Petrie's property.

See also

Murrumba Homestead Grounds, the heritage-listed remains of Thomas Petrie's homestead
Petrie, Queensland
Gilburri - Escaped convict adopted by Aboriginals. Mentioned in Petrie's book.

References

Further reading 
  Full text available online.

External links
 

1831 births
1910 deaths
Explorers of Australia
Explorers of Queensland
Linguists of Australian Aboriginal languages